Michael Harty may refer to:

 Michael Harty (bishop), Irish former Roman Catholic prelate and former Bishop of Killaloe
 Michael Harty (politician), Irish former Independent Teachta Dála for Clare